Pierce Pond is a small lake located north of the hamlet of French Woods in Delaware County, New York. Pierce Pond drains northwest via an Lakin Brook which flows into Peas Eddy Brook.

See also
 List of lakes in New York

References 

Lakes of New York (state)
Lakes of Delaware County, New York